John Rae (born 1912, date of death unknown) was a Scottish footballer who played for Clyde, Dumbarton, East Stirlingshire and Bristol City. He worked as a scout at the latter for several decades.

References

1912 births
Date of birth missing
2007 deaths
Place of death missing
Scottish footballers
Dumbarton F.C. players
Clyde F.C. players
East Stirlingshire F.C. players
Camelon Juniors F.C. players
Bristol City F.C. players
Scottish Football League players
English Football League players
Scottish Junior Football Association players
Association football forwards
Association football scouts
Bristol City F.C. non-playing staff